Neytiri te Tskaha Mo'at'ite, also known as Neytiri Sully, is a fictional character in the American science fiction film series Avatar, created by James Cameron. While in a Pandoran forest, Neytiri meets a lost Jake Sully, and saves him from a pack of viperwolves. Neytiri soon becomes his teacher, helping him complete several tasks, and eventually falls in love and mates with him. Neytiri fights alongside Jake in the assault on the Tree of Souls and saves him from being killed by Colonel Miles Quaritch, and driving the RDA off of Pandora. Over the following fifteen years, Neytiri has three children with Jake: Neteyam, Lo'ak, and Tuk, and adopts two others: Kiri and Miles "Spider" Socorro.

The character is portrayed by Zoe Saldaña in Avatar (2009) and its sequels, including Avatar: The Way of Water (2022) and the upcoming Avatar 3. She also appears in literature, including various comic book series published by Dark Horse Comics. Various merchandise of the character have also been produced, including action figures and toys produced for McDonald's Happy Meals.

Production history

Origins
The origins for Neytiri date back to the late 1970s, when James Cameron was preparing Xenogenesis, a short film intended to be used as a pitch for a feature-length film that never happened.  The film features a painting of a female blue skinned alien.  He later stated that after the film was turned down, he kept thinking about the idea of a blue skinned alien and decided to recycle it when developing Avatar in the early 1990s (which was then known as Project 880). Further inspiration for the look of Neytiri came from the description of a dream his mother had in which she saw a blue-skinned woman 12 feet (4 m) tall. In earlier drafts of the screenplay, Neytiri was known as "Zuleika Te Kaha Polenoma".

Casting
In the 1990s, when Avatar began to be developed, Charisma Carpenter was set to play the role. But by the time the film had been greenlit in 2006, Carpenter had become too old for the role and was thus not cast. Cameron then began a worldwide search for actresses to play the role, with Q'orianka Kilcher being considered and Emily Blunt auditioning for the role. Eventually, Cameron cast Zoe Saldaña in the role. Since she was cast early in production, Saldaña helped screen-test actors auditioning for the part of Jake Sully, including eventual co-star Sam Worthington.

Appearances

Films

Avatar (2009)

One day while Neytiri is hunting in the woods of Pandora, she spots Jake Sully's avatar and begins to stalk him. As she is about to kill the armed intruder with a bow, a woodsprite floats down and gently touches her arrowhead, telling her that the avatar is pure. She continues to follow the avatar because of this symbol. When Jake is attacked by a pack of viperwolves, she protects him by fending off the creatures. Although Jake tries to thank her for saving her, she rejects him, as she wants nothing to do with the humans.  Suddenly, dozens of woodsprites land on Jake. Amazed by what she just witnessed, Neytiri sees this as a good omen from Eywa and takes him to Hometree; the home of the Omaticaya Clan.  

Upon arrival, Tsu'tey attacks Jake and attempts to kill him, but Neytiri stops him explaining the sign she had received from Eywa. Jake is then taken to meet with Eytukan and Mo'at, Neytiri's parents, who decide that they must study Jake, as he is the first Avatar who was a soldier and not a scientist.  Much to her chagrin, Neytiri is tasked with teaching Jake the Na'vi ways.

Over the following three months, Neytiri teaches Jake the ways of the Na'vi. She shows him how to move through the Pandoran jungle, make  tsaheylu (a bond that allows him to ride direhorses and ikran), how to speak the Na'vi language, and teaches him hunting rituals. She also tells him Na'vi stories, including the story of the Toruk Makto, a mythical Na'vi warrior who was closely linked with Eywa and therefore able to make tsaheylu with the Toruk, a legendary Pandoran creature. During this time, she also falls in love with Jake and eventually, they mate.

After Jake reveals his true mission and explains that the RDA was coming to destroy Hometree, Neytiri furiously rejects him and the Na'vi subsequently take both Jake and Grace captive before preparing for the defense of their home. When the RDA arrives, the Na'vi make a futile stand against them but are quickly overwhelmed and flee into the forest. The RDA destroys Hometree, taking several Na'vi casualties, including Eytukan. Jake finds her and attempts to comfort her, but she again rejects him, demanding he go away and never come back.

Neytiri and the other surviving members of the Omaticaya Clan then seek refuge at the Tree of Souls, where they pray that Eywa will save them.  Their prayers are answered when Jake returns, having made tsaheylu with the Toruk. Recognizing his close connection to Eywa, Neytiri forgives him and accepts him again. She then helps Jake rally the other Na'vi clans to prepare for an impending attack from the RDA, who plan to strike and destroy the Tree of Souls. During the subsequent battle, the Na'vi suffer heavy casualties, but are rescued when Pandoran wildlife unexpectedly join the attack and overwhelm the humans, which Neytiri interprets as Eywa's answer to Jake's prayer. Jake destroys a makeshift bomber before it can reach the Tree of Souls; Quaritch, wearing an AMP suit, escapes from his own damaged aircraft, then later finds and breaks open the avatar link unit containing Jake's human body, exposing it to Pandora's poisonous atmosphere. As Quaritch prepares to slit the throat of Jake's avatar, Neytiri kills Quaritch, saving Jake from suffocation and seeing his human form for the first time.

With the exceptions of Jake, Norm and a select few others, all humans are expelled from Pandora and sent back to Earth. Neytiri watches over Jake as he is permanently transferred into his avatar with the aid of the Tree of Souls.

Avatar: The Way of Water (2022)

More than a decade later, Neytiri and Jake have settled down and raised a family consisting of: Neteyam, their first son and oldest child, Lo'ak, their second son, and Tuktirey ("Tuk"), their daughter and youngest child, all of whom are Na'vi. They have also adopted Kiri, a teenage Na'vi and the daughter of Grace Augustne’s Na’vi avatar, and Miles "Spider" Socorro, the human son of Miles Quaritch. After the RDA returns and attempts to colonize Pandora again, Jake and the Omaticaya fight against the RDA supply lines, their Recombinants (Na’vi avatars containing the memories of Quaritch along other deceased soldiers) Jake capture their children. Jake and Neytiri arrive and free them, except for Spider, who is taken by Quaritch. Recognizing his son, Quaritch decides to spend time with Spider in order to draw him to their side. Aware of the danger Spider's knowledge of his whereabouts poses to their safety, Jake convinces Neytiri to exile their family from the Omaticaya and retreat to the Metkayina, and are reluctantly taken in by clan chief Tonowari. The family learns their ways, Kiri develops a spiritual bond with the sea and its creatures, and Lo'ak befriends Tsireya, the daughter of Tonowari and his wife Ronal, while also butting heads with Tsireya's brother Aonung. 

Aonung and his friends entice Lo’ak to a trip into the farther reaches of the ocean and leave him stranded as a prank. Lo'ak then befriends Payakan, a tulkun, an intelligent and pacifistic cetacean species whom the Metkayina consider their spiritual family. Upon his return, Tonowari forces Aonung to apologize for his actions, but Lo'ak takes the blame on himself, winning Aonung's friendship.  He later finds out that Payakan is an outcast among his species since he went against his species‘ pacifist ways and attacked the whalers who killed his mother. Kiri then attempts to link with the Metkayina's Spirit Tree to meet her mother but suffers a violent seizure. She is healed by Ronal, but when Jake calls Norm Spellman and Max Patel for help, the RDA are able to track them down. Bringing Spider with him, Quaritch commandeers a whaling vessel which is hunting tulkuns to harvest their brain enzymes for anti-aging remedies. After Quaritch and the whaling crew begin killing tulkuns in order to draw Jake out, Lo'ak, along with his siblings, Tsireya, Aonung, and Rotxo head off to warn Payakan.

They find Payakan being chased by the whalers, and Lo'ak, Tsireya, and Tuk are captured by Quaritch. With their children in danger, Jake, Neytiri, and the Metkayina set out to confront the humans. Quaritch forces Jake to surrender, but upon seeing Lo'ak imperiled, Payakan attacks the whalers, triggering a fight that kills most of the crew and sinks the vessel. Neteyam rescues Lo'ak, Tsireya, and Spider, but is fatally shot. Jake faces Quaritch, who uses Kiri as a hostage, desists after Neytiri does the same with Spider. Trapped inside the sinking vessel, Jake strangles Quaritch into unconsciousness and is rescued by Lo'ak and Payakan while Kiri saves Neytiri and Tuk. Spider rescues Quaritch, but renounces his cruelty and rejoins Jake's family. After Neteyam's funeral, Jake informs Tonowari and Ronal of his decision to leave the Metkayina, but he instead identifies him as part of the clan and allows them to stay.

Literature

Avatar: The Next Shadow (2021)
Two weeks after the Na'vi's victory over the RDA, several clans are still struggling with the losses and damages they suffered during the battle. Neytiri volunteers to help the Olangi Clan, who suffered the most casualties from the war. She finds Jake at the gravesite of his human body, still suffering internal conflicts about his transition into his avatar body. Neytiri warns Jake that this isn't healthy for him before leaving.

Neytiri returns a couple of days later after receiving news that the family of Tsu'tey had poisoned Jake with a knife, leaving him in a coma. She finds Jake at the gravesite, they embrace and she asks him what happened. Jake dismisses the situation and downplays the events, telling Neytiri it's "just a scratch". Neytiri points out that he doesn't seem like himself, but Jake reassures her that he has never felt more like himself and finally leaves his human body behind.

Avatar: Adapt or Die (2022)
Years before the events of Avatar, Dr. Grace Augustine contacts the Omaticaya Clan and proposes the idea of a school where the Na'vi and humans could interact. Mo'at and Eytukan are against the idea, but consult their daughters Neytiri and Sylwanin, along with other Na'vi children for their opinions on the matter. They request to visit Hell's Gate, and Mo'at takes them there to meet Grace and learn about human operations. Grace gives Neytiri and the other kids a tour of the base and teaches them how to play basketball. After returning home, Mo'at asks the children about what they think about attending the human school. While Neytiri is excited about the idea, Sylwanin points out that at the school, the humans will learn from the Na'vi, but not the other way around. Mo'at and Eytukan agree and decide to open the school, but the latter gets suspicious after children including Neytiri who went to Hell's Gate begin developing symptoms of a mysterious illness.

Mo'at discusses this with Grace, asking if the disease came from Hell's Gate, who is shocked and denies it; Mo'at believes there was no malice, but is unconvinced that the disease didn't come from humans. Grace leaves Mo'at with supplies and returns to her lab in Hell's Gate, where Parker Selfridge assures Grace that the RDA was not responsible for the sickness. Meanwhile, Eytukan questions Mo'at about Grace's supplies informs her that Neytiri's sickness is getting worse. 

Grace returns and is told by Mo'at that the sickness has begun infecting adults as well. Mo'at and Grace then begin a journey to visit the Tawkami Clan, Pandora's master botanists, hoping that they will have more knowledge of the sickness.  

At Grace's school, Neytiri and Sylwanin learn to speak English, being regarded as the “top students”, but the school is attacked and Sylwanin is shot and killed. This strains the human's relationship between the Na'vi, who ban them from their land. Meanwhile, Neytiri gets engaged to Sylwanin's fiancé, Tsu'tey, in order to also be the next Tsahìk.

Merchandise
Mattel made an action figure of Neytiri as part of a range of Avatar action figures produced for the first film. She was also included in a range of Avatar toys produced for McDonald's Happy Meals. Lego has produced Minifigures of Neytiri for its Lego Avatar theme. Of the ten sets released so far, Sully appears in 4 of them, with 4 minifigures representing her various looks throughout both films.

In other media
 Neytiri appears in the 2010 porn parody/spiritual sequel film This Ain't Avatar, portrayed by Misty Stone
 In the 2011 The Simpsons "Treehouse of Horror XXII" segment "In the Na'vi", a parody of Avatar, Neytiri's role is filled by original character Kamala, voiced by Tress MacNeille. The daughter of Kang, an adult Bart (in his avatar body) ends up getting her pregnant after falling in love with her, before leading the species of the planet against the military after Milhouse calls them there as they were supposed to. In the aftermath of the conflict, Bart learns that Kang and Kodos would have freely given the military the Hilarrium they were looking for if they had just asked. Kamala subsequently returned as an unlockable character in the freemium city-building mobile game The Simpsons: Tapped Out, with MacNeille reprising her role.

Reception
For her performance in Avatar, Saldaña won Best Actress at the 36th Saturn Awards.  As of 2021, she is one of four fully motion capture performances to win a Saturn Award and the only woman to do so.

She was also nominated for  Outstanding Supporting Actress at the Black Reel Awards and Outstanding Supporting Actress in a Motion Picture at the NAACP Image Awards.

For her performance in Avatar: The Way of Water, Saldana won the Washington D.C. Area Film Critics Association Award for Best Motion Capture Performance, beating out co-stars Sam Worthington and Sigourney Weaver.

Family tree

Notes 

  Some text in this article was copied from Neytiri at Avatar Wiki, which is released under a Creative Commons Attribution-Share Alike 3.0 (Unported) (CC-BY-SA-3.0) license.

References 

Action film characters
Adventure film characters
Avatar (franchise)
Characters created by James Cameron
Extraterrestrial characters in films
Female characters in film
Fictional archers
Fictional characters with post-traumatic stress disorder
Fictional people from the 22nd-century
Fictional princesses
Fictional professional hunters
Fictional refugees
Fictional women soldiers and warriors
Film characters introduced in 2009
Science fiction film characters